Agamemnon "Memos" Ioannou (born April 15th, 1958 in Greece) is a retired Greek professional basketball player and coach. At 6'2¾" (1.90 m), he played at the point guard and shooting guard positions.

Professional playing career
Ioannou had a successful playing career with Panathinaikos, as he won 6 Greek League championships (1975, 1977, 1980, 1981, 1982, 1984) and 4 Greek Cups (1979, 1982, 1983, 1986) with the club. He also won another Greek Cup with Aris, in the 1991–92 season. At that final, he was interim coach. In 1991, he won the FIBA European Cup Winners' Cup (later called FIBA Saporta Cup) championship, while playing with PAOK. In 1993, Ioannou won the FIBA European Cup again, this time while playing with Aris.

National team playing career
Ioannou was also a member of the senior men's Greek national team that won the gold medal at the EuroBasket 1987. He also played at the 1988 FIBA European Olympic Qualifying Tournament and the 1990 FIBA World Championship.

Coaching career
After his playing career ended, Ioannou became a professional basketball coach. As a head coach, he won four Cypriot League championships, in the years 1998, 1999, 2000, and 2001. He was named the Greek League Best Coach in 2005.

Personal life
Ioannou is the father of the professional basketball player Stelios Ioannou. He also worked as a color commentator for EuroLeague and Greek Basket League game broadcasts, on Greek TV.

References

External links 
FIBA Profile
Hellenic Basketball Federation Profile 

1958 births
Living people
APOEL B.C. coaches
Aris B.C. coaches
Aris B.C. players
FIBA EuroBasket-winning players
Greek basketball coaches
Greek men's basketball players
1990 FIBA World Championship players
Holargos B.C. coaches
Ilysiakos B.C. coaches
Keravnos B.C. coaches
Panathinaikos B.C. players
Panionios B.C. coaches
P.A.O.K. BC players
Papagou B.C. players
Point guards
Shooting guards
Basketball players from Athens